Msunduzi Local Municipality is a local municipality in Umgungundlovu District Municipality, KwaZulu-Natal, South Africa. It encompasses the city of Pietermaritzburg, which is the capital of the KwaZulu-Natal province and the main economic hub of Umgungundlovu District Municipality.

Msunduzi Municipality is situated on the N3 highway at a junction of an industrial corridor (from Durban to Pietermaritzburg) and an 
agro-industrial corridor (stretching from Pietermaritzburg to Estcourt). On the regional scale, it is located at the cross section of the N3 
corridor and the Greytown Road corridor to the north, a tourist route to Drakensberg and Kokstad Road to the south.

The city of Pietermaritzburg is a provincial and national centre of educational excellence. Pietermaritzburg is a seat of the University of KwaZulu-Natal and is home to several other institutions of higher learning. In addition, Pietermaritzburg is home to a host of private and government-owned institutions of primary and secondary education. (See Educational Institutions of Pietermaritzburg.)

Politics 

The Msunduzi Local Municipality council consists of eighty-one members elected by mixed-member proportional representation. Forty-one councillors are elected by first-past-the-post voting in forty-one wards, while the remaining forty are chosen from party lists so that the total number of party representatives is proportional to the number of votes received. In the election of 1 November 2021 the African National Congress (ANC) lost its majority, obtaining a plurality of forty seats. The following table shows the results of the election.

Mayors
 Hloni Glenford Zondi, 2000-2006 
 Zanele Hlatshwayo, 2006-2010 
 Mike Tarr, May 2010-2011 
 Chris Ndlela, 2011-2016 
 Themba Njilo, 2016–August 2019

Mzimkhulu Thebolla, August 2019-present

Main places
The 2001 census divided the municipality into the following main places:

References

External links
 Official website

Local municipalities of the Umgungundlovu District Municipality